Road to Hell is a 2008 action-fantasy film directed by Albert Pyun. It was inspired by Walter Hill's Streets of Fire and began shooting that same year in June at Los Angeles. Pyun states that the genesis of Road to Hell began when he and Paré attended a film festival in Spain.

Cast
 Michael Paré as Tom Cody 
 Deborah Van Valkenburgh as Reva Cody, Tom's Sister
 Clare Kramer as Caitlin 
 Courtney Peldon as Ashley 
 Anita Leeman as Ellen Aim 
 Lauren Sutherland as McCoy
 Joei Fulco as Gabriel The Archangel
 Roxy Gunn as Ellen Dream
 Chris Reject as DJ Dante
 Paige Lauren Billiot as "Honey Dew"
 Nicholas Lahesich as "Baby Doll"
 Norbert Weisser as Farnsworth, The Interrogator
 Scott Paulin as Brick Bardo, The Driver

Release
The film had its world premiere at the Alamo Drafthouse Cinema in Austin, Texas, in October 2008. The Chicago premiere of Road to Hell was at the Patio Theater on March 9, 2013. In November 2013, additional shooting was done with singer Joei Fulco from ABC's reality television show Wife Swap.

Awards
2012 PollyGrind Film Festival:
Best Fantasy Movie
Best Actor: Michael Paré 
Best Actress: Clare Kramer 
Newcomer Award: Roxy Gunn 
Best Supporting Actress In A Fantasy Film: Deborah Van Valkenburgh
Best Writer: Cynthia Curnan, Ph.D.
Best Visual Effects: Daniel Ray Gutierrez
Best Song: Streets of Fire 
Best Use Of Music: Albert Pyun

2012 Yellow Fever Independent Film Festival:
Best Film

References

External links
Official site (archived)

2008 films
2008 fantasy films
American independent films
Films directed by Albert Pyun
2000s English-language films
2000s American films